Jobst I, Count of Hoya ( – 6 January 1507) was the ruling Count of Upper Hoya from 1466 to 1503 and Count of  Hoya from 1503 until his death.

Life 
Jobst was a son of Count John V of Hoya and Elizabeth of Diepholz. Since his father married fairly late, Jobst was not yet old enough to govern the county when he inherited it in 1466.
His uncle Albert Jobst, Bishop of Minden to up the regency.

Jobst had two brothers, Eric and John.  They did not reach adulthood.

During his reign, the branch of the House of Hoya with ruled Lower Hoya died out in the male line.  This led to a dispute between Jobst and the Dukes of Brunswick-Lüneburg about who should inherit.  In 1504, Jobst had to his imperial immediacy and accept the County of Hoya as a fief from the Dukes of Brunswick-Lüneburg.  He had to pay a large sum of money to receive this fief.  This debt burdened the Counts of Hoya for the rest of the 16th century and caused the financial decline of the family.

Marriage and issue 
In 1488, Jobst married Ermengarda of Lippe.  They had six children:
 Jobst II (1493–1545), succeeded Jobst I as Count of Hoya
 John VII, (d. 1535), a commander in the Swedish army
 Eric IV, (d. 1547), ruler of Hoya-Stolzenau
 Anna, canoness in Vreden Abbey
 Elisabeth, abbess in Essen Abbey
 Mary, married Jodok of Bronckhorst and Boekelo

References 
 Heinrich Gade: Historisch-geographisch-statistische Beschreibung der Grafschaften Hoya und Diepholz, Nienburg, 1901
 Wilhelm Hodenberg (ed.): Hoyer Urkundenbuch, Hannover, 1848–1856
 Bernd Ulrich Hucker: Die Grafen von Hoya, Hoya, 1993
 Museum Nienburg: Die Grafschaften Bruchhausen, Diepholz, Hoya und Wölpe, Nienburg, 2000

Counts of Hoya
1460 births
1507 deaths
15th-century German people